Hopemead State Park is an undeveloped public recreation area on the eastern shore of Gardner Lake,  west of Norwich, Connecticut.

History
The park lands were purchased in 1954 with funds bequeathed by George Dudley Seymour. Seymour's trustees acquired the land from the children of James E. Fuller, who had bought them when they were the lakeside farm of Salomon Gardner. The donation of the land to the state was announced in 1955. At the time of the donation, the site included a main house, summer lodge, carriage house, and barn. The structures were torn down and the site allowed to return to its natural state.

Activities and amenities
The undeveloped site offers opportunities for hiking and fishing. The main trail runs through forested land for a little over a mile from Cottage Road to Gardner Lake.

References

External links
Hopemead State Park Connecticut Department of Energy and Environmental Protection
Gardner Lake Bathymetry Map Connecticut Department of Energy and Environmental Protection

State parks of Connecticut
Parks in New London County, Connecticut
Bozrah, Connecticut
Montville, Connecticut
Protected areas established in 1954
1954 establishments in Connecticut